Peddavadugur is a village in Anantapur district of the Indian state of Andhra Pradesh. It is the mandal headquarters of Peddavadugur mandal in Anantapur revenue division.

References 

 Peddavadugur is one of most popular village in ananthapur district, SAI BABA TEMPLE very famous in this village.

Villages in Anantapur district
Mandal headquarters in Anantapur district

Sai Baba Temple has not been completed in this village.